SM Rookies (stylized as SMROOKIES) is a pre-debut training team created by South Korean entertainment agency SM Entertainment in 2013, composed of trainees who have yet to join an idol group. From 2013 to 2018, the team officially introduced 30 members, with 25 of them later debuting in the groups Red Velvet (4), NCT and its first four subunits (19), Aespa (1), and Lami as an actress.

History

2013–2017: Formation and debuts of Red Velvet and NCT

SM Entertainment formally announced the creation of SM Rookies on December 3, 2013, featuring members Seulgi, Jeno and Taeyong. On December 9, Irene, Jaehyun and Lami were introduced. On December 16, members Mark, Hansol, and Jisung were introduced, followed by Johnny, Ten and Yuta on December 23.

In January 2014, SM Rookies opened their official Twitter account. Wendy was introduced on March 13, 2014, with the song "Because Of You", recorded for the soundtrack of the SM C&C-produced series Mimi. On March 19, 2014, a video of Wendy singing "Speak Now" by Taylor Swift was released. In April, SM Entertainment launched the official website of SM Rookies project, which they announced with a video teaser uploaded onto their official YouTube channel, featuring Irene, Seulgi, Wendy, Taeyong, Jaehyun, and Mark. Seulgi later featured on labelmate Henry's song "Butterfly". On July 17, a performance video of Irene and Seulgi dancing to the song "Be Natural" by S.E.S. was released, credited to SR14G.
Member Donghyuck was later introduced on July 17, 2014. On July 21, Taeyong released a track video for the song "Open The Door". On July 22, Mark and Donghyuck featured in the first video of the Rookie Station project.
Later that month, the agency confirmed Irene, Seulgi, and Wendy as members of the group Red Velvet. On August 14, SM Rookies member Yeri featured in the third video of Rookie Station alongside Taeyong, Yuta, Jaehyun, Mark, Jeno and Donghyuck. On August 21, the fourth video of the Rookies Station series was released. On August 24, a video of Johnny, Taeyong and Hansol dancing to the song "Super Moon" was released, credited to SR14B. On September 16, the sixth video of the Rookie Station was released, featuring members Johnny, Yuta, Ten, and Jaehyun. 
On October 9, Taeyong featured in Red Velvet's single "Be Natural".

On January 16, 2015, member Doyoung was introduced as he and Jaehyun were to become the new MCs of MBC Music's Show Champion. On February 19, 2015, Johnny, Yuta, Ten, and Lami released their Lunar New Year greetings. In February, a report of Red Velvet filming a music video with trainee Yeri leaked online. The following month, SM Entertainment formally introduced Yeri as the fifth member of Red Velvet. On March 6, a clip of Hansol, Johnny, Taeyong, Yuta, Ten, and Jaehyun (as SR15B) dancing to the song "Bassbot" was released. After months of being featured in various SM Rookies events, Jaemin was formally introduced in April. In June, Ten and Jaehyun competed in the Hope Basketball All-Star event. Later that month, SM Rookies featured in News 'Korean Pop Idols Rule Asia' featuring Mark giving a short talk. On July 9, 2015, members Koeun, Hina, and Herin were introduced as they were to become "Mouseketeers" on Disney Channel Korea's The Mickey Mouse Club alongside Mark, Jeno, Donghyuck, Jaemin, Jisung, and Lami. On July 26, SM Entertainment announced a concert for the team's male members, titled SM Rookies Show.
On July 30, a video of Hansol, Johnny, Taeyong, Yuta, Ten, and Jaehyun (as SR15B) performing a dance routine was released. On October 13, 2015, Taeil was introduced after being featured in multiple SM Rookies events. In November, female members of SM Rookies performed a dance in the video "Rookies Entertainment App Launching". On December 18, Kun was formally introduced. On December 22, Lami, Hina, and fellow trainee Park Jungyeon made appearances in video teasers for Winter Garden 2015.

On January 5, 2016, WinWin was introduced. On January 26, Taeil released the song "Because Of You" for the soundtrack of the series The Merchant: Gaekju 2015. 
SM Entertainment founder Lee Soo-man announced a concept for a new boy group, to be called NCT, in which different teams would debut based in different countries around the world. In April 2016, the agency announced Taeil, Taeyong, Doyoung, Ten, Jaehyun and Mark as members of NCT's first sub-unit, NCT U. In July, the agency also confirmed Yuta, WinWin and Donghyuck (now known by his stage name Haechan) as members of NCT's second sub-unit, NCT 127. In August, the agency confirmed Jeno, Jaemin and Jisung as members of NCT's third sub-unit, NCT Dream, alongside Mark and Haechan.
On September 19, Yiyang and Ningning were introduced followed by their appearances on the online reality show My SMT. In December, the agency confirmed Johnny as a new member of NCT 127.

On April 5, 2017, Lucas was introduced, followed by Jungwoo on April 17. Jungwoo and Koeun made appearances in the music video of Super Junior member Yesung's single "Paper Umbrella" later that month. After almost a one-year absence, member Kun appeared with Lucas and Jungwoo for the opening SM Rookies' Instagram account. In late June, Herin was confirmed as a contestant of Mnet's survival show Idol School, leading to her departure from the team and SM Entertainment. Hansol followed in October, participating as a contestant in the KBS survival show The Unit.

2018: New NCT members, and debut of WayV
In January 2018, NCT unveiled a "large scale project" for the year called NCT 2018, and some members of SM Rookies were seen in Ukraine filming a music video for a possible comeback. Members Jungwoo and Lucas were spotted alongside other NCT members in the airport en route to Ukraine. On January 30, SM Entertainment confirmed the debut of remaining SM Rookies members Kun, Lucas, and Jungwoo through the video "NCT 2018 Yearbook #1". On February 13, it was revealed that Lucas and Jungwoo would be making their official debut through NCT U's comeback single "Boss" alongside members Taeyong, Doyoung, Jaehyun, Winwin, and Mark. The music video for "Boss" was released on February 18.

On July 17, three male Chinese trainees—Hendery, Xiaojun, and Yangyang—were introduced. On October 1, it was confirmed that Yiyang (이양) left SM Entertainment and returned to China to join the idol competition show The Next Top Bang. On December 31, SM Entertainment announced the debut of Hendery, Xiaojun and Yangyang as members of NCT's Chinese sub-unit, WayV.

2020: Formation of Aespa 

On October 26, SM Entertainment announced the formation of their new girl group, Aespa. On October 29, Ningning were introduced as the third member of the group, which debuted on November 17.

2022: New members, and Lami's debut
On July 1, 2022, SM Entertainment introduced three new male trainees: Eunseok, Shohei, and Seunghan to the SM Rookies lineup. In November 2022, it was announced they would star in the reality show Welcome to NCT Universe.

On December 9, 2022, SM Entertainment confirmed that Lami would be debuting as an actress, making her the final member of the original lineup introduced back in 2013 to make an official debut.

Members

Current members

Debuted members

Former members

Filmography

Television shows

Discography

Official releases

Songs recorded
Names in italics indicate other trainees participating in the recording.

Concert participation
Names in italics indicate other trainees that participated in the event.
 SM Town Week (2013) (as opening act) 
 Taeil, Hansol, Johnny, Yuta, Ten, Jaehyun, Jeno, Haechan, Jisung, Yongju
 SM Town Live World Tour IV (2014–2015)
 Hansol, Johnny, Taeyong, Yuta, Doyoung, Ten, Jaehyun, Yeri, Koeun, Mark, Jeno, Haechan, Hina, Jaemin, Jisung, Herin, Winny, Jeesu
 SM Rookies Show (2015–2016)
 Taeil, Hansol, Johnny, Taeyong, Yuta, Doyoung, Ten, Jaehyun, Mark, Jeno, Haechan, Jaemin, Jisung
 SM Town Live 2022: SMCU Express (2022)
 Shohei, Eunseok, Seunghan

Notes

See also
K-pop#Trainee system

References

External links
 

2013 establishments in South Korea
2013 introductions
K-pop music groups
Musical groups established in 2013
Musical groups from Seoul
Session musicians
SM Entertainment artists
SM Town
Red Velvet (group)
NCT (band)
Aespa
South Korean dance music groups
South Korean idol groups